Provincial Road 315 (PR 315) is a provincial road in the eastern region of Manitoba, Canada.  It begins at PR 313 northeast of Lac du Bonnet and ends at the Ontario boundary, running through the southern part of Nopiming Provincial Park.

Provincial Roads 304, 313, 314, and 315, along with PTH 11, form a loop that provides access to several remote communities, First Nations, and provincial parks on the eastern side of Lake Winnipeg.

References

External links 
Manitoba Official Map

315